Dissomorphia is a genus of moths in the family Geometridae.

Species
 Dissomorphia australiaria (Guenée, 1857)

References
 Dissomorphia at Markku Savela's Lepidoptera and Some Other Life Forms
 Natural History Museum Lepidoptera genus database

Macariini
Geometridae genera